Formed in 1875, the Pinal County Sheriff's Office (PCSO) is the 3rd largest sheriff's office in Arizona, serving unincorporated areas of Pinal County, Arizona. PCSO provides patrol services, criminal investigation, search and rescue services, and operates the county jail. PCSO's annual budget is nearly 40 million dollars annually, which covers all aspects of the Sheriff’s Office to include the Detention Center.  There are nearly 500 employees within the department, 220 are patrol deputies.  PCSO is headquartered in Florence, AZ. The current Sheriff is Mark Lamb, elected in November, 2016.

Patrol Bureau 
Pinal County covers 5,374 square miles and is approximately the size of Connecticut. The county is divided into two Regions. The Patrol Bureau is overseen by a Captain and 3 Lieutenants.

Region A, or Adam Region, comprises the unincorporated community of San Tan Valley, Gold Canyon, and some areas of Queen Creek.

Region B, or Baker Region, covers the eastern half of the county including the areas of Arizona City, Stanfield, Saddlebrooke, Oracle, and San Manuel.

Special Units 
Air Support Unit

One of the PCSO Air Support Unit’s primary functions is search and rescue. The unit's main craft, a UH-1V "Huey" rotorcraft helicopter, was obtained through the military surplus program and is equipped with a hoist to assist in rescues. The Air Unit regularly flies Operation Stonegarden missions, assisting the U.S. Border Patrol in its efforts.

Anti-Smuggling Unit

The Anti-Smuggling Unit (ASU) is composed of a Sergeant and six Investigators. All operate out of the Criminal Investigations Bureau of the Pinal County Sheriff's Office. The unit targets criminal groups involved in human and drug smuggling. ASU also partners with U.S. Border patrol and Homeland Security.

ASU typically patrols a five-mile stretch of land between the reservation and I-8, attempting to apprehend those crossing illegally there. This desert area south of Maricopa, situated approximately 70 miles north of the border, sees some of the most drug trafficking activity in the Southwest.  Smugglers cross the U.S.- Mexico border and walk through the desert for up to a week, until they reach the I-8 corridor. ASU's patrolling of this corridor is often the last line of defense before smuggled drugs enter the Phoenix area. PCSO estimates 40% percent of all drugs in the United States enter through Arizona.

K-9 Unit

The Pinal County Sheriff's Office K-9 Unit consists of six handler teams.

Four teams support Patrol with the interdiction of drugs entering and passing through Pinal County along major roadways and highways. K-9s regularly intercept loads of counterfeit fentanyl pills being smuggled along the I-10.  In 2017, PCSO K-9s discovered 550 pounds of marijuana, seven pounds of meth, 69 pounds of heroin and 53 pounds of cocaine.

Two more K-9 teams are assigned to the Adult Detention Center to assist in maintaining order and detect any contraband attempting to be smuggled into the Adult Detention Facility. The Pinal County Sheriff’s Office has been using K-9’s to serve and protect the County of Pinal for more than 40-years.

Narcotics Task Force

The Pinal County Narcotics Task Force is a multi-agency task force composed of an administrative Sergeant, an operations Sergeant, nine Investigators and an administrative secretary. The PCNTF is tasked with investigating, prosecuting, disrupting and dismantling individuals and/or groups involved in possession, sales, manufacturing, cultivating, trafficking and smuggling of illegal drugs in or through Pinal County and surrounding areas. On average, PCNTF investigates approximately 200 of these case types annually.

All operate out of the Criminal Investigations Bureau of the Pinal County Sheriff's Office. The Task Force is a High Intensity Drug Trafficking Area (HIDTA) program Initiative/Task Force, which falls under the Southwest HIDTA Group.

Search and Rescue

The Search and Rescue Unit conducts day and night mobile SAR operations, sometimes during adverse weather conditions, in both urban and wilderness environments. Deputies are on call 24 hours a day, 365 days a year, and at a moment's notice to provide assistance in a crisis. The SAR Unit searches for children, the elderly, unprepared and injured hikers, lost hunters and downed aircraft.

Detention Center 
The Pinal County Detention Center houses on average 600 inmates a day. Inmates are offered several pre-release programs to reduce recidivism, including tablets to help advance their education, free tattoo removal to increase chances of employment, and a designated wing for veteran inmates, called the Housing Unit for Military Veterans, or HUMV.

Sheriffs 
Since the founding of the department in 1875, there have been 23 Pinal County Sheriffs.
 Michael Rogers (1875)
 Peter R. Brady (1876–1877)
 John Peter Gabriel (1878–1882 and 1885–1886)
 Andrew James Doran (1883–1884)
 Jere Fryer (1887–1891)
 Lemuel K Drais (1892–93)
 William C Truman (1894–1903)
 Thomas N. Wills (1904– 1907)
 James E McGee (1908–1914)
 Henry D. Hall (1915–1920)
 William A Benson (1925)
 Enis T. Thurman (1921–1924)
 Walter E. Laveen (1925–1938)
 James E. Herron Jr. (1939–1946)
 Lynn Earley (1947–1952)
 Laurence R. White (1953–1961)
 Coy K. De Arman (1962–1974)
 W B Tex Whitington (1975–76)
 Frank R. Reyes (1977–2000)
 Roger Vanderpool (2001–2005)
 Chris Vasquez (2005–2009)
Paul Babeu (2009–2017)
Mark Lamb (2017 to present)

Popular media 
The Pinal County Sheriffs Office has had reoccurring appearances on A&E's television series Live PD.

The Pinal County Jail is featured in Season 5 of 60 Days In., a television docu-series on A&E.

See also 
 List of law enforcement agencies in Arizona

Reference section

External links section 
 

Sheriffs' offices of Arizona
1875 establishments in Arizona Territory
Government of Pinal County, Arizona